Walter B. Hargreaves (1907–1998), also known by the affectionate nickname of 'The Wee Professor', was a conductor for brass bands.

During his career, Hargreaves conducted the Grassmarket Silver Band, Crook Hall Band, and the Stanshawe Band as well as many others across England.

References 

 The modern brass band: from the 1930s to the new millennium  by Roy Newsome. p,156''

Scottish conductors (music)
British male conductors (music)
1998 deaths
1907 births
20th-century Scottish musicians
20th-century British conductors (music)
20th-century British male musicians